Stanislav Vladimirovich Dubrovin (: born 2 September 1974) is a Russian-Uzbekistani football coach and a former player.

Dubrovin has played in the Russian First Division for FC Zhemchuzhina Sochi, FC Alania Vladikavkaz and FC Ural Sverdlovsk Oblast.

Honours
 Russian Third League Zone 2 top scorer: 1996 (32 goals)
 Russian Second Division Zone South top scorer: 2006 (28 goals)

External links
 Profile at FC-Ural.ru 
 Russian First Division Squads 2008
 Profile & Statistics at One.co.il 

1974 births
Living people
Sportspeople from Tashkent
FC Zhemchuzhina Sochi players
Pakhtakor Tashkent FK players
FC Spartak Vladikavkaz players
Hapoel Petah Tikva F.C. players
Maccabi Petah Tikva F.C. players
Maccabi Kiryat Gat F.C. players
FC Sibir Novosibirsk players
Russian expatriate footballers
Expatriate footballers in Latvia
Expatriate footballers in Israel
Dinaburg FC players
FC Ural Yekaterinburg players
Uzbekistani footballers
Russian footballers
Soviet footballers
Association football forwards
Russian Premier League players
Russian expatriate sportspeople in Latvia
FC Volgar Astrakhan players
FC Ufa players
FC Yugra Nizhnevartovsk players
Russian football managers
FC Tambov players
FC Neftekhimik Nizhnekamsk players
FC Dynamo Vologda players